Habshi dynasty refers to the rule of Ethiopian Abyssinian rulers in Bengal that lasted from 1487 to 1493 or 1494 during the Bengal Sultanate. Four Habshi rulers ruled Bengal during this period. This rule began with the rebellion against and assassination of Jalaluddin Fateh Shah of the Ilyas Shahi dynasty.

Background
Before the Ilyas Shahi dynasty, it was customary for Muslim rulers to purchase Abyssinian slaves and appoint them to royal palaces or important positions in the kingdom. Even during the reign of Jalaluddin Fateh Shah, some slaves were appointed as palace guards, who gradually increased their power among themselves. Jalaluddin tried to rein them in. But the Habshis rebelled under the leadership of Shahzada Barbak and killed the Sultan and seized the throne.

Reign

Shahzada Barbak 

Shahzada Barbak killed Jalaluddin Fateh Shah in 1487 and assumed the rule. He took the royal name Ghiyasuddin Shahzada Barbak. As his reign was short-lived, he was able to start few coins. A few months after his accession to the throne, Ilyas Shahi's loyal Malik Andil Khan killed him and took the throne.

Saifuddin Feroz Shah 

Andil Habshi or Saifuddin Firuz Shah ruled Bengal for two years. He killed Barbak and took the throne. He is credited by many as the main founder of Habshi rule. Because Barbak ruled for a short time. He was reportedly impotent. He was generous and kind. He ruled from 1487 to 1489. According to most historians, he died a natural death. However, according to some historians like Ghulam Husain Salim and Jadunath, he was also killed by one of the palace guards.

Mahmud Shah II

Mahmud Shah II was the adopted son of Saifuddin Firuz Shah. He took over as an infant. His royal regent was Habash Khan. After a year in 1490, Sidi Badr killed him and Habash Khan and took over the rule.

Shamsuddin Mozaffar Shah

Shamsuddin Muzaffar Shah or Sidi Badr was the Abyssinian ruler who ruled Bengal for the longest time. Intent on capturing Bengal, he first killed Habash Khan, the royal regent of Sultan Mahmud Shah II, before proceeding to assassinate the Sultan. Badr Shams-ud-Din ascended the throne assuming the title of Muzaffar Shah.

He raised an army of thirty thousand soldiers; Among them were thousands of Afghans and five thousand Abyssinians. He defeated the Kamata kingdom in battle and conquered their territory in 1492/92. In 1494 his wazir (chief minister) Sayyed Hussain led a revolt in which he was killed.

Fall and Legacy
Due to political instability and a lack of capacity to deal with injustices, Habashi rule eventually fell. Although Saifuddin Firuz Shah was compassionate, but he could not spread that much power. On the contrary, Shamsuddin Mজzaffar Shah, who was focused on expanding his power, was also focused on empowering the Abyssinians in Bengal. Described by Indo-Persian historians as a tyrant, his cruelty was said to have alienated the nobility as well as his common subjects. In 1494, a rebellion led by Syed Hussain led to the death of Shamsuddin Mozaffar Shah. Syed Hossain ascended the throne with the name Alauddin Husain Shah. He expelled all the Abyssinians from power and banished the Abyssinians from the area. Eventually the Habashis were forced to move to different areas of the Deccan and Gujarat.

See also
 Bengal Sultanate
 Hussain Shahi dynasty

References

Further Read
 Memorials
 Sarkar, Jadunath. History of Bengal, Volume II, Muslim Era, 1200–1757.
 Sinha, Sutpa. Gaur Rediscovered: The Medieval Capital of Bengal.
 Ferista, Mohammad Qasim. Tarikh-i-Ferista: A History of the Rise of Muslim Power in India, to 1612 AD, Volume IV.

Dynasties of Bengal